Postgraduate Work is a self-produced 7" record released by MC Paul Barman. He recorded it a year after graduating from Brown University.

Barman mailed a copy of the 7" to Prince Paul, who was impressed enough to agree to produce the rapper's first EP.

Track listing
"MC Fibonacci Sequence vs. Interrupting Rapper"
"A Very Sad Story"
"Enter Pan-Man"
"The Name In All Caps"

References

MC Paul Barman albums
1998 EPs